Geoffrey Jideofor Kwusike Onyeama  (born 2 February 1956) is a Nigerian politician, who is the Minister of Foreign Affairs of Nigeria. He was appointed Foreign Affairs Minister in November 2015 by President Muhammadu Buhari.

Early life and education

Onyeama was born to the family of Nigerian jurist Charles Onyeama. His family has links to the Nigerian chieftaincy system; his grandfather, Onyeama of Eke, was a paramount chief in Colonial Igboland.

Onyeama holds a Bachelor of Arts (B.A) degree in political science from Columbia University, New York, in 1977 and a Bachelor of Arts (B.A) degree in law from St John's College, Cambridge, in 1980. He holds a Master of Law (LL.M) from the London School of Economics and Political Science in 1982 and a Master of Arts (M.A) in Law from St John's College, Cambridge in 1984. Onyeama was admitted as a  Barrister-at-Law of  the Supreme Court of Nigeria in 1983 and was also called to the English Bar of the Grey's Inn in 1981.

Career

Onyeama began his career as a research officer in the Nigerian Law Reform Commission Lagos from 1983 to 1984. He then worked as a lawyer with Mogboh and Associates in Enugu, Nigeria from 1984 to 1985. In 1985, he joined the World Intellectual Property Organization (WIPO) as an assistant programme officer for development cooperation and external relations, Bureau for Africa and Western Asia. He rose through the ranks at the WIPO to become deputy director general for the development sector in 2009. In November 2015 he was appointed Nigeria's minister of foreign affairs by President Muhammadu Buhari.

Personal life 

Onyeama is married; and has three children. His current wife is Sulola; with whom Onyeama has two children. Previously, Onyeama was married to Christian Onoh's daughter: Nuzo Onoh and they had Onyeama's first child and daughter named Candice Onyeama; a screenwriter and filmmaker.

On 19 July 2020, Onyeama went into medical isolation, after announcing that he had tested positive for COVID-19. In late August 2020, Onyeama recovered from COVID-19 coronavirus disease; and went back to his leadership service as HMFA: Honourable Minister for Foreign Affairs at Nigeria's Ministry of Foreign Affairs.

Author Dillibe Onyeama (1951–2022) was his brother.

See also
List of current foreign ministers
Cabinet of Nigeria
Minister of Foreign Affairs (Nigeria)

References

1956 births
Living people
Alumni of St John's College, Cambridge
Alumni of the London School of Economics
Columbia College (New York) alumni
Federal ministers of Nigeria
Foreign ministers of Nigeria
Nigerian officials of the United Nations
People from Enugu
World Intellectual Property Organization people